Buribay (Bürebay) is a rural locality (a selo) and the administrative centre of Buribayevsky Selsoviet, Khaybullinsky District, Bashkortostan, Russia. The population was 315 as of 2010. There are 39 streets.

Geography 
Buribay is located 14 km north of Akyar (the district's administrative centre) by road. Tatyr-Uzyak is the nearest rural locality.

References 

Rural localities in Khaybullinsky District